Bufo is a Finnish film production company established in 2007 by the producers Mark Lwoff and Misha Jaari, and the scriptwriter Vesa Virtanen.

The company has produced several feature and documentary films, including The Good Son (2011) by Zaida Bergroth, The Interrogation (2009) by Jörn Donner and Concrete Night directed by Pirjo Honkasalo and based on the novel of the same name by Pirkko Saisio. The film was premiered in January 2017.

References

External links
Official website
Bufo on IMDB

Companies based in Helsinki
Finnish companies established in 2007
Film production companies of Finland